"Introduce Me a Good Person" is a remake song recorded by South Korean singer and Red Velvet member Joy for the soundtrack of the 2020 drama series Hospital Playlist. Originally recorded and released by Basis in 1996 the song was re-recorded and was released on March 20, 2020, by Studio MaumC, EggIsComing, and Stone Music Entertainment. Composed by Jung Jae-hyung and written by Kim Hee-tam, the song was noted for its rhythmical and acoustic elements. The song peaked at position six on South Korea's Gaon Digital Chart and peaked at position five on the Billboard K-Pop 100.

Background and composition 
According to Studio MaumC, Joy will be participating at the soundtrack for the drama series Hospital Playlist, revealing "Introduce Me a Good Person" would be released at noon of March 20, 2020. The song is a remake of the same name released by Basis in 1996. It was noted that the track would be "reborn as a more cheerful song in about 24 years" with Joy's "refreshing voice"."Introduce Me a Good Person" was composed by Jung Jae-hyung, while the lyrics were written by Kim Hee-tam. The arrangement was performed by two-member production team Lundi Blues. It was reported that the remake version "maximized" the rhythm and melody of the original song as it was "loved by the public in the past". The track is noted for its rhythmical and acoustic elements that add to Joy's "clear vocal tone". The song is composed in the key of E-flat major with a tempo of 94 beats per minute. The lyrics is noted for being "lovely" that has been enhanced by Joy's "clear and refreshing voice".

Promotion and reception 
The music video for "Introduce Me a Good Person" was released on March 20, 2020. On September 4, 2020, Joy performed the song on Yoo Hee-yeol's Sketchbook.

"Introduce Me a Good Person" debuted at position 143 on the 12th weekly issue of South Korea's Gaon Digital Chart for 2020 during the period dated March 15–21. It peaked at position six on the 21st weekly issue of the chart. The song also debuted at position 32 on the component Download Chart and peaked at position 11. It also debuted at position 196 on the component Streaming Chart and peaked at position nine. In addition, the track debuted at position 45 on the component BGM Chart and peaked at position 31. The song appeared as the 34th biggest hit single on 2020's Gaon Year-End Digital Chart. The song entered the Billboard K-Pop 100 at position 73 and peaked at five.

Accolades

Track listing 

 Digital download / streaming

 "Introduce Me a Good Person"3:03
 "Introduce Me a Good Person (Instrumental)"3:04

Credits and personnel 
Credits adapted from Melon.

Studio

 Recorded at SM Lvyin Studio
 Mixed at GoldenbellTree Sound
 Mastered at Sound Max

Personnel

 Joyvocals
 Kim Hee-tamsongwriting
 Jung Jae-hyungcomposition
 Lundi Bluesarrangement
 Lee Tae-wookguitar
 Dailogbass
 Snowman of Lundi Bluesdrum
 Jung Ye-wonchorus
 Lee Ji-hongrecording
 Hong Sung-joonmixing
 Do Jeonghoemastering
 Park Junmastering

Charts

Weekly charts

Monthly charts

Year-end charts

Release history

References 

2020 singles
1996 songs
Joy (singer) songs
South Korean television drama theme songs